Kukulu is an endless runner video game developed by Ethiopian video game company Qene Technology, which is located in Addis Ababa, and published by Gebeya. It is the first video game to utilize 3D graphics in Ethiopian history, and available on iOS and Android versions. Since its release on 15 April 2018, the game has garnered over 3,000 downloads and a 4.8 rating score on the Google Play Store as of August 2018.

Gameplay
Kukulu is an endless runner game involves the character of chicken named "Kukulu" chased by countryman in a small village in Ethiopia. During the running, two abettor birds, "Ergeb" (dove) and "Qura" (crow) assisted her the way, dropping power-ups. These power-ups used for avoiding oncoming obstacles. Collecting the bright colored bean known as "kolo" will boost energy of the character. There are also magical items throughout the game, which occasionally aid to gain power. Failure from any obstacles would relieve the chaser along with his dog and resulted in capture.

Development and premise
Qene Technology was founded in January 2017 by CEO and lead game developer Dawit Abraham along with Samrawit Demeke and Henok Teklu. The initial objective of the company was to "create African themed fictional superheroes". In conversation with Dawit Abraham and Samrawit Demeke, they explained Africa is still "underrepresented in gaming industry", and the game's entire model is uniquely "African design" with provision of premium quality. The developers wanted to distribute the game with small scale market before they met with colleagues Amadou Daffe and Hiruye Amanuel, co-founders of Gebeya. According to Dawit, "Gebeya incubated Kukulu, and we were able to finance the production and many other cost of the game".

Plot
The game opens with cutscene of newborn orphaned chicken hatching from egg. After her growth and produce children, she unexpectedly confronted by old countryman and his dog, finally captured and thrown into poultry house restrained by cage. Luckily, the fowl is escaped when two pigeons arrived in the house and give supernatural force that could open the cage to free the fowl.

The countryman arrived to house with knife for slaughter, but the bird intimidatingly managed to escape the man and chase begins.

Reception 
In June 2018, Kukulu was awarded Best Media and Entertainment Award at the AppsAfrica.

References

External links
 Kukulu on YouTube

2018 video games
Endless runner games
Mobile games
Android (operating system) games
iOS games
Video games about birds
Video games developed in Ethiopia
Qene Technology video games
Single-player video games